Inongo Territory is a second-level administrative area (territory) in Maï-Ndombe Province in the Democratic Republic of the Congo. Its headquarters is in the provincial capital of Inongo.

Inongo Territory covers 24,149 km² and is divided into three administrative divisions or "sectors":
Basengele, with the groupings (groupements) of Bokote, Mbelo, Mpenge, Ngongo;
Bolia, with the groupings (groupements) of Bokwala, Lokanga, and Nkile (Nkita);
Inongo, with the groupings (groupements) of Ibenga, Iyembe, and Ntombanzale.

References

Territories of Mai-Ndombe Province